Horii (written: 堀井) is a Japanese surname. Notable people with the surname include:

, Japanese footballer
, Japanese speed skater and politician
, Japanese swimmer
, Japanese gravure idol
, Japanese general
, Japanese footballer
, Japanese video game designer

Japanese-language surnames